Hwasa is a South Korean singer-songwriter. She debuted as a member of Mamamoo in 2014. In February 2019, she made her debut as a solo artist with the digital single "Twit".


Awards and nominations

Other accolades

Listicles

Notes

References

Hwasa